"Strangers" is a song recorded by Australian singer-songwriter Tia Gostelow, featuring Lanks. It was released in June 2018 as the fifth single from Gostelow's debut studio album, Thick Skin. In 2020, the song was certified gold in Australia.

Reception
Al Newstead from ABC said "The duet doesn't fuss around, it's built around an instantly accessible guitar part and illuminated by haunting vocal harmonies." Newstead compared the song to the vibe of Angus & Julia Stone and Number 1 Dads.

Certifications

Release history

References
 

2018 singles
2018 songs